The 2001 Kerala Legislative Assembly election was held on 10 May 2001 to elect members to the Kerala State Assembly. Polls were held simultaneously in all 140 seats and resulted in a voter turnout of 72.47%.

The election saw a change of guard in the state with the United Democratic Front winning 99 seats as opposed to the 40 won by the Left Democratic Front. The remaining seat was won by a UDF rebel candidate.

Results

Constituency-Wise results

References 
Kerala
2011
2011